Porter Township is a township in Schuylkill County, Pennsylvania, United States. The population was 2,157 at the 2020 census.

Geography
According to the United States Census Bureau, the township has a total area of 18.1 square miles (46.9 km2), of which 18.1 square miles (46.9 km2)  is land and 0.06% is water.

Demographics

At the 2000 census there were 2,032 people, 851 households, and 622 families living in the township.  The population density was 112.3 people per square mile (43.4/km2).  There were 921 housing units at an average density of 50.9/sq mi (19.7/km2).  The racial makeup of the township was 99.61% White, 0.15% Asian, and 0.25% from two or more races. Hispanic or Latino of any race were 0.44%.

Of the 851 households 26.3% had children under the age of 18 living with them, 58.5% were married couples living together, 9.3% had a female householder with no husband present, and 26.8% were non-families. 23.6% of households were one person and 14.6% were one person aged 65 or older.  The average household size was 2.39 and the average family size was 2.78.

The age distribution was 21.2% under the age of 18, 7.3% from 18 to 24, 28.5% from 25 to 44, 25.5% from 45 to 64, and 17.5% 65 or older.  The median age was 40 years. For every 100 females there were 99.6 males.  For every 100 females age 18 and over, there were 98.1 males.

The median household income was $36,957 and the median family income  was $43,684. Males had a median income of $31,418 versus $21,705 for females. The per capita income for the township was $18,373.  About 4.2% of families and 5.9% of the population were below the poverty line, including 4.5% of those under age 18 and 9.6% of those age 65 or over.

References

Townships in Schuylkill County, Pennsylvania